The Mainair Rapier is a British ultralight trike that was designed and produced by Mainair Sports and later P&M Aviation. The aircraft was supplied as a completed aircraft or as a kit for amateur construction, followed by a factory inspection prior to flight.

Design and development
The aircraft was designed as a lower-cost touring trike than the Mainair Blade. It features a cable-braced hang glider-style high-wing, weight-shift controls, a two-seats-in-tandem, open cockpit, tricycle landing gear and a single engine in pusher configuration.

The aircraft is made from bolted-together aluminium tubing, with its double-surface wing covered in Dacron sailcloth. Its  span wing is supported by a single tube-type kingpost and uses an "A" frame control bar. The occupants are accommodated in tandem seating, with a fibreglass cockpit fairing that includes a small windshield. To keep costs down, the factory supplied engine was the  Rotax 503 twin cylinder, two-stroke, air cooled powerplant. The twin cylinder, two-stroke, liquid cooled  Rotax 582 was an available option.

Specifications (Rapier)

References

Mainair Rapier
1990s British ultralight aircraft
Single-engined pusher aircraft
Ultralight trikes